Andy Edine Dahmani (born February 12, 1983) is a French-Algerian professional footballer who played as a defender.

He also played at the club level in Ligue 2 for Troyes AC.

See also
Football in Algeria
List of football clubs in Algeria

References

External links
+ 
 

Living people
1983 births
People from Saint-Chamond
Sportspeople from Loire (department)
Association football defenders
Algerian footballers
CA Bastia players
French footballers
French sportspeople of Algerian descent
Ligue 2 players
ES Troyes AC players
MC Alger players
Red Star F.C. players
Andrézieux-Bouthéon FC players
FC Montceau Bourgogne players
US Feurs players
GOAL FC players
French expatriate footballers
French expatriate sportspeople in Algeria
Expatriate footballers in Algeria
Footballers from Auvergne-Rhône-Alpes